Hunziker House or Hunziker Residence, in Syracuse, New York, was designed by Ward Wellington Ward and was built in 1926.  It was listed on the National Register of Historic Places in 1997.

It was listed for its architecture.

References

Houses in Syracuse, New York
National Register of Historic Places in Syracuse, New York
Houses on the National Register of Historic Places in New York (state)
Houses completed in 1926